The Technological Association Malaysia is a professional association and learned society for technological and engineering sciences with its corporate office in Subang Jaya and its branch building in Seremban. It was founded on 15 April 1946 in Selangor, and has been verified by The Malaysia Book of Records as the oldest technical civil society.

Membership grades
TAM attracts people with wide scope of interests in many disciplines.  An individual can be elected as a student member, associate, member, or fellow. Institutional membership is available for organizations.  There are several grades of TAM membership:

Corporate Membership 
 Fellow
 Member

Non-Corporate Membership 
 Honorary Fellow
 Honorary Member
 Graduate Member
 Student Member
 Associate
 Institutional Member

Post-nominal letters
Under Rule 13 (b) of the Memorandum and Article of Association of TAM, elected individuals are entitled to use the following post-nominal letters in accordance with their membership grades:

 Hon. FTAM for Honorary Fellows
 Hon. MTAM for Honorary Members
 FTAM for Fellows; LFTAM for Life Fellows
 MTAM for Members; LMTAM for Life Members
 Grad. TAM for Graduate Members
 Stud. TAM for Student Members
 Assoc. TAM for Associates

References

External links

75th Anniversary Celebration of Technological Association Malaysia

Organizations associated with ASEAN
Engineering societies